The 1974–75 Northern Premier League was the seventh season of the Northern Premier League, a regional football league in Northern England, the northern areas of the Midlands and North Wales. The season began on 17 August 1974 and concluded on 12 May 1975.

Overview
South Shields changed their name to Gateshead United and moved from Simonside Hall to Gateshead Youth Stadium.

Team changes
The following club left the League at the end of the previous season:
Bradford Park Avenue  folded

The following club joined the League at the start of the season:
Worksop Town promoted from Midland League (1889) (returning after a five year's absence)

League table

Results

Stadia and locations

Cup results

Challenge Cup

Northern Premier League Shield

Between Champions of NPL Premier Division and Winners of the NPL Cup.

FA Cup

Out of the twenty-four clubs from the Northern Premier League, only four teams reached for the second round:

Second Round

Third Round

Fourth Round

FA Trophy
Out of the twenty-four clubs from the Northern Premier League, four teams reached for the fourth round:

Fourth Round

Semi-finals

Final

End of the season
At the end of the seventh season of the Northern Premier League none of the teams put forward for election received enough votes to be promoted to the Football League.

Football League elections
Alongside the four Football League teams facing re-election, a total of twelve non-League teams applied for election, four of which were from the Northern Premier League.  All four Football League teams were re-elected.

Promotion and relegation
No clubs were promoted, conversely, none of the clubs were relegated.

References

External links
 Northern Premier League official website
 Northern Premier League tables at RSSSF
 Football Club History Database

Northern Premier League seasons
5